Jeong Gi-seon (born 25 April 1937) is a South Korean sprinter. He competed in the men's 100 metres at the 1964 Summer Olympics.

References

1937 births
Living people
Athletes (track and field) at the 1964 Summer Olympics
South Korean male sprinters
Olympic athletes of South Korea
Place of birth missing (living people)